William Mills Ivins Jr. (1881–1961) was curator of the department of prints at the Metropolitan Museum of Art, New York, from its founding in 1916 until 1946, when he was succeeded by A. Hyatt Mayor.

The son of William Mills Ivins Sr. (1851–1915), a public utility lawyer who had been the 1905 Republican candidate for Mayor of New York City, Ivins studied at Harvard College and the University of Munich before graduating in law from Columbia University in 1907.

After nine years' legal practice, he was asked to take on the conservation and interpretation of the Met's print collection.  He built up the remarkable collections that can be seen there today, and he wrote many prefaces to exhibition catalogues, as well as other, occasional pieces which were later collected and published.  His best-known book is Prints and Visual Communication (MIT Press, 1969,  (first published 1953 by Harvard University Press)), and his How Prints Look (1943, revised edition 1987) remains in print.

See also
Visual communication

References

External links
Obituary
William Mills Ivins papers at the Smithsonian Archives of American Art
 

1881 births
1961 deaths
American art critics
American art curators
Harvard College alumni
Columbia Law School alumni
American art historians
20th-century American historians
20th-century American male writers
Ludwig Maximilian University of Munich alumni
American male non-fiction writers